Roche Tower is a skyscraper in the Swiss city of Basel. At 178 metres, it is the second tallest building in the country.

The building, also known as "Building 1", was financed by pharmaceutical company Hoffmann-La Roche and designed by Herzog & de Meuron. It cost 550 million Swiss francs to build. The entire construction ensemble, including a planned 205-metre "Building 2" research facility, is expected to cost three billion francs in total.

When finished on 18 September 2015, Roche Tower overtook Prime Tower in Zürich as Switzerland's tallest building, the latter having held the record for four years. Strict planning laws mean there are few skyscrapers in the country. For the construction of the building, measures against earthquakes were envisioned and it stands on 143 pillars of reinforced concrete. It is supposed to endure an earthquake of 6.9 on the Richter scale and therefore surpass the security regulations by the government.

References

External links

Official website
Information at Basel.com

Buildings and structures in Basel
Skyscrapers in Switzerland
Office buildings completed in 2015
Skyscraper office buildings
21st-century architecture in Switzerland